Sun Tin Wai Estate is a public housing estate in Tai Wai, New Territories, Hong Kong. It was built on the hill at the south of Chun Shek Estate along Lion Rock Tunnel Road and consists of 8 residential blocks completed in 1981 and 1982.

Fung Shing Court is a Home Ownership Scheme court in Tai Wai, near Sun Tin Wai Estate. It consists of three residential buildings built in 1985.

Houses

Sun Tin Wai Estate

Fung Shing Court

Demographics
According to the 2016 by-census, Sun Tin Wai Estate had a population of 8,826 while King Tin Court had a population of 5,940. Altogether the population amounts to 14,766.

Politics
For the 2019 District Council election, the estate fell within two constituencies. Sun Tin Wai Estate is located in the Sun Tin Wai constituency, which was formerly represented by Ching Cheung-ying until July 2021, while Fung Shing Court falls within the Chun Fung constituency, which is currently represented by Chan Nok-hang.

COVID-19 pandemic
Foo Wai House of the estate was placed under lockdown on 26 February, 2022.

See also

 Public housing estates in Tai Wai
 San Tin Village

References

Residential buildings completed in 1981
Public housing estates in Hong Kong
Tai Wai
1981 establishments in Hong Kong